Fabri is a surname. Notable people with the surname include:

 Anna Fabri (f. 1496), Swedish publisher and printer
 Annibale Pio Fabri (1697–1760), Italian singer and composer
 Emanuel Fabri (born 1952), Maltese footballer
 Ernst Fabri (1891–1966), Austrian writer and journalist
 Felix Fabri (c.1441–1502), Swiss Dominican theologian
 Frances Fabri (1929–2006), Hungarian-born author
 Georg Fabri (died 1498), Bishop of Mainz
 Honoré Fabri (1607–1688), French Jesuit theologian
 Johann Ernst Fabri (1755–1825), German geographer and statistician
 Johannes Fabri (f.1434–1451), Bishop of Osnabrück
 Johannes Fabri (died 1458), Bishop of Paderborn
 Julien Fabri (born 1994), French footballer
 Kurt Fabri (1932–1990), Austrian-born Soviet animal behavior scientist
 Martinus Fabri (died 1400), Dutch composer in The Hague
 Ratna Fabri (fl. 1971), Indian museologist
 Rodrigo Fabri (born 1976), Brazilian footballer
 Sisto Fabri (1540–1594), Italian Dominican theologian and canon lawyer
 Stefano Fabri (c.1670–1755), Italian composer
 Thomas Fabri (c.1380–c.1420), Flemish composer in Bruges
 Zoltán Fábri (1917–1994), Hungarian film director and screenwriter
Roger Fabri, King of Cadence | Sultan of Speed

Fabri can also be a shortened form of the names "Fabricio" or "Fabrizio". Notable people with this nickname include:
 Fabri González (born 1955), Spanish footballer
 Fabri Fibra (born 1976), Italian rapper
 Fabri (born 1987), Spanish footballer

See also 
 Fabre
 Fabbri
 Fabry

Latin-language surnames
Occupational surnames